Athrips tsaidamica is a moth of the family Gelechiidae. It is found in China (Quinghai, Inner Mongolia).

The wingspan is about 19 mm. The forewings are covered with dark yellow, brown-tipped scales and with two dark brown spots about one-third and three very small indistinct dark brown spots at three-fourths. The hindwings are grey. Adults are on wing in May and July.

References

Moths described in 1982
Athrips
Moths of Asia